The House of a Thousand Candles is a 1915 American silent mystery film directed by Thomas N. Heffron and starring Harry Mestayer, Grace Darmond and John Charles. Based on a novel of the same name by Meredith Nicholson, it was remade twice. In 1919 another silent film Haunting Shadows and a 1936 sound film The House of a Thousand Candles.

Cast
 Harry Mestayer as Jack Glenarm 
 Grace Darmond as Marian Evans 
 John Charles as Arthur Pickering 
 George Backus as John Marshall 'Squire' Glenarm 
 Forrest Robinson as Bates 
 Edgar Nelson as Larry Donovan 
 Emma Glenwood as Theresa Evans 
 Gladys Samms as Olivia Evans 
 Mary Robson as Carmen 
 Effingham Pinto as Don Jose

References

Bibliography
 Goble, Alan. The Complete Index to Literary Sources in Film. Walter de Gruyter, 1999.

External links
 

1915 films
1915 mystery films
1910s English-language films
American silent feature films
American mystery films
American black-and-white films
Films directed by Thomas N. Heffron
Films based on American novels
Selig Polyscope Company films
Silent mystery films
1910s American films